Louis-Dreyfus may refer to:

People
Gérard Louis-Dreyfus (1932–2016), chairman of Louis Dreyfus Energy Services
Julia Louis-Dreyfus (born 1961), American actress and comedian
Kyril Louis-Dreyfus (born 1997), French businessman and chairman of Sunderland A.F.C.
Léopold Louis-Dreyfus (1833–1915), French founder of the Louis Dreyfus Group and patriarch of the Louis-Dreyfus family
Louis Louis-Dreyfus (1867–1940), co-director of the Louis Dreyfus Group
Margarita Louis-Dreyfus (born 1962), Russian-born chairwoman of the Louis Dreyfus Group; widow of Robert Louis-Dreyfus 
Philippe Louis-Dreyfus (born 1945), French businessman, president of Louis Dreyfus Armateurs
Pierre Louis-Dreyfus (1908–2011), French Resistance fighter during World War II, CEO of the Louis Dreyfus Group and race car driver
Robert Louis-Dreyfus (1946–2009), French/Swiss billionaire and CEO of Adidas

Corporations
 Louis Dreyfus Group, an international trading group, founded in 1851
 Louis Dreyfus Armateurs, a French maritime  transportation and logistics company, originally the shipping branch of the Louis Dreyfus Group

See also
Louis G. Dreyfus, Jr., American diplomat